is a Japanese yonkoma online manga series written and illustrated by Choborau Nyopomi. It has been adapted into an anime television series. A second season was announced on the anime's website in the beginning of April. A third season was announced in November 2016 and premiered in January 2017.

The story follows the lives of the girls Ai, Mai, Mi and Ponoka-senpai, who together form the "Manga Club" where they fight against alien invaders, face fierce rivals and do all sorts of crazy things when they are not drawing manga.

Ponoka-senpai's shell-shocked reaction to a forex market crash from volume 2 of the manga and episode 9 of the anime became an internet meme called . In 2014, DMM FX, the world's second largest forex company by trading volume at the time, had a collaboration with Ai Mai Mi where new users could receive T-shirts with Ponoka's glassy expression on them.

Characters
 Ai (voiced by Yuka Ōtsubo) is the most level headed girl in the club, and the only one who draws manga, but occasionally she participates in her friends' antics.
 Mai (voiced by Aya Uchida) is a classmate of Ai and a childhood friend of Mi. She has a naive and affectionate demeanor, but she can be shown sadistic at times.
 Mi (voiced by Maaya Uchida) is a classmate of Ai and childhood friend of Mai. She is the perpetrator of most of the group's antics and even takes them to extremes not condoned by everyone else. She makes herself out to be brave but can be a coward at times.
 Ponoko-Senpai (voiced by Ai Kayano) is an upper classman in the group's school. She fixes most of the gang's problems with a clay pot.

References

External links
Official manga website 

2000s webcomics
2010s webcomics
2013 anime television series debuts
2014 anime television series debuts
2017 anime television series debuts
Anime series based on manga
Comedy web series
Extraterrestrials in anime and manga
Japanese animated web series
Japanese webcomics
Manga adapted into television series
Manga Life Win manga
Seinen manga
Seven (animation studio)
Surreal comedy anime and manga
Television shows based on Japanese webcomics
Webcomics in print
Yonkoma